Hugo Allan García Molina is a Guatemalan Olympic middle-distance runner. He represented his country in the men's 1500 meters and the 3000 metres steeplechase at the 1984 Summer Olympics. His time was a 3:57.59 in the 1500, and a 9:02.41 in the 3000 steeplechase heats.

References 

1963 births
Living people
Guatemalan male middle-distance runners
Olympic athletes of Guatemala
Athletes (track and field) at the 1984 Summer Olympics
Pan American Games competitors for Guatemala
Athletes (track and field) at the 1987 Pan American Games